Castroviejoa is a genus of plants in the family Asteraceae, native to certain islands in the western Mediterranean.

 Species
 Castroviejoa frigida (Labill.) Galbany, L.Sáez & Benedí - Corsica, Sardinia
 Castroviejoa montelinasana (Em.Schmid) Galbany, L.Sáez & Benedí - Sardinia

References

Gnaphalieae
Asteraceae genera